Fires on the Plain can refer to:

 Fires on the Plain (novel), a Japanese novel
 Fires on the Plain (1959 film), a 1959 Japanese film
 Fires on the Plain (2014 film), a 2014 Japanese film